Vattappara  is a village in Thiruvananthapuram district in the state of Kerala, India.
, well known for its geographical peculiarities with quarries that are generally used for extracting building materials (rock).This town is by the side of MC Road connecting Trivandrum and Kottayam and 14 km away from Trivandrum City. The nearest township is Nedumangad.There is no recorded history on the origin of this place. The major occupation in Vattappara is farming(Rubber, Coconut).

Demographics
 India census, Vattappara had a population of 23105 with 11343 males and 11762 females.

 Akshaya E Cetre, Kanacode, Vattappara
 SUT Academy of Medical Sciences, Vencode, Vattappara
 PMS College of Dental Science & Research, Golden Hills, Vattappara
 Lourdes Mount Higher Secondary School, Kanakkode, Vattappara
 Nuzzo Nursery, Pallivila, Vattappara
 L M S H S S, Vattappara
 Seventh Day Adventist English Medium School, Vattapara
 Little Flower LP school, Kazhunad kallayam vattappara
 LMA LPS Kanacode, Vattappara
 Shalom Special School, Vattappara
 Stephen's Dental Centre, Vattappara
 Sathyam Institute Of Information Technology, Vattappara
 Sneha Agencies, Vattappara
 Lens & Light Digital Studio Vattappara
 Royal Driving School Vencode, Vattappara
 Amal Cafe, Vattappara

Religion

Temples 
 The Thiruchittapara Anjaneya Swamy Temple
 The Muchannoor Thampuran Sri Durga Devi Temple
 The Kodoor Sri Bhagavathi Temple
 The Panniyodu Panchami Devi Temple, Pallivila, Vattappara
 The Kuttiyani Sree Dharma Sasta Temple at Kuttiyani
 Mottamoodu Paalayamketti lord Siva temple
 Vettinad Ooroottumandapam Temple
 Sri Endalayappan Ttemple, Kazhunadu
 Sri Endalayappan Temple
 Sri Thampuran temple, Pallivila, Vattappara
 Ramaraserry Sree Bhadra Parameshwari Devi Temple, Vattappara

Churches 
 St. Francis Xavier Latin Catholic Church
 CSI Church, Vattappara
 Seventh-Day Adventist Church
 Jehovah Jireh Prayer Assembly Church, Stephens tower Vattappara

Transport

Road
The major portion of the road transportation is provided by KSRTC ( Kerala State Road Transport Corporation).There are frequent bus services through this route. There is no private bus service in this place.

Banks

Banks
  SBI Vattappara
  KSFE Vattappara
  Uco Bank Vattappara
  Dhanlakshmi Bank Vattappara
  Kerala gramin bank Vattappara
  Union Bank of India

Police station

Vattappara Police Station
Vattappara Police Station. Ph: 9497980137

Rail
The nearest Railway Station is Trivandrum Central railway station which is 15 km from Vattappara.

Air
The nearest airport is Trivandrum International Airport which is 20 km from Vattappara.

Geography
North : Vembayam
East  : Nedumangad
West  : Pothencode
South : Mannanthala

For More Details contact:-

External links 
 [Satellite picture of vattappara junction http://wikimapia.org/180045/Vattappara-junction]

References

Villages in Thiruvananthapuram district